Northern Bengali, also known as Uttaravaṅgīẏa or Udīcya, is a nonstandard dialect cluster of Bengali spoken in northern parts of Bangladesh and West Bengal, as well adjacent areas of Assam, Bihar, Jharkhand, and Nepal.

Geographical distribution 
Dr. Muhammad Shahidullah divided all Bengali dialects into two groups: Prācya and Pāścātya. Within his Pāścātya grouping, he created the division of "Northern" or "Udīcya", corresponding to the combined dialect groups of "Varendra" and "Kāmarūpa" proposed by Suniti Kumar Chatterji, with the remaining area corresponding to Rāḍha dialects. This Northern Bengali dialect is said to be spoken from Goalpara to Purnia, encompassing much of the historical regions of Kamarupa and Varendra. This area includes the modern divisions of Rangpur and Rajshahi in Bangladesh as well as Jalpaiguri and Malda in West Bengal.

Comparison

References

Further reading 
 
 
 
 
 

Eastern Indo-Aryan languages
Bengali dialects
Languages of West Bengal
Languages of Bangladesh
Languages of Tripura